INS Kohassa  is an Indian naval air station under the Andaman and Nicobar Command of the Indian Armed Forces. It is located at Shibpur, a village located on North Andaman Island.

History
INS Kohassa was established as Naval Air Station (NAS) Shibpur in 2001 as a Forward Operating Air Base (FOAB) for enhanced surveillance in North Andaman. Presently, Dornier 228 aircraft and HAL Chetak helicopters of the navy and the Indian Coast Guard land at Shibpur once in a week, on their transit for surveillance of North Andaman Islands. In addition, the Indian Air Force operates its Dornier aircraft between Port Blair and Diglipur every Thursday for courier duties. In 2009, the government of India accorded sanction to commission NAS Shibpur as a full-fledged air station. The length of the runway is being extended to 12,000 ft and will enable day and night operations.

Dornier 228s of the navy and coast guard conducted search for Malaysia Airlines Flight 370 from this base.

In 2017, it was reported that the runway length would be extended to 3000m after acquisition of about 100 hectares of land. This will enable the operation of wide-bodied civil and defense flights. The station, earlier known as NAS Shibpur, was renamed as INS Kohassa after the extension of facilities in January 2019.

See also
 Indian navy 
 List of Indian Navy bases
 List of active Indian Navy ships

 Integrated commands and units
 Armed Forces Special Operations Division
 Defence Cyber Agency
 Integrated Defence Staff
 Integrated Space Cell
 Indian Nuclear Command Authority
 Indian Armed Forces
 Special Forces of India

 Other lists
 Strategic Forces Command
 List of Indian Air Force stations
 List of Indian Navy bases
 India's overseas military bases

References

Kohassa
Buildings and structures in the Andaman and Nicobar Islands
Airports in the Andaman and Nicobar Islands